Events from the year 2007 in Iran.

Incumbents
 Supreme Leader: Ali Khamenei
 President: Mahmoud Ahmadinejad
 Vice President: Parviz Davoodi
 Chief Justice: Mahmoud Hashemi Shahroudi

Deaths

 12 June – Mahdi Ghalibafian.

See also
 Years in Iraq
 Years in Afghanistan

Events

References

 
Iran
Years of the 21st century in Iran
2000s in Iran
Iran